Qytezë (or Qyteza in its definite form in Albanian) is a community in the Korçë County, southern Albania. At the 2015 local government reform it became part of the municipality Devoll. The settlement is known for being the birthplace of Anastasios Veloussi, aka Adam Anastas Beloushi, the father of  comedian/actor/musicians, John and James Belushi.

Qyteza was formed during the 18th century from the Orthodox settlers of nearby abandoned villages, wrecked from the Ottoman oppression. Local people have contributed to the Albanian National Awakening, June Revolution, and the National Liberation Movement (Albania).

Vasil Tromara, an Albanian patriot, would be remembered for raising the Albanian flag in Korçë, on November 28, 1920, marking the end of the inter-dependencies of the region and final incorporation in Albania.

Migration has always characterized the village; nowadays only a few families are still residing in it.

People
Belushi family (see John and James Belushi)
John Papajani, former Washington State Senator
Aristotel Samsuri, Albanian footballer and Communist partisan, proclaimed national martyr in 1981 having died in German captivity in World War II
Petraq Samsuri, Albanian writer
Kolë Tromara, patriot, Vatra activist, leader of Balli Kombëtar
Vasil Tromara, Albanian patriot and freedom fighter

References

Populated places in Devoll (municipality)
Villages in Korçë County